Rhea's Obsession's debut album, Initiation, was released in 1996 on Spider Records after they had worked on soundtracks for film and television. The album was re-released with bonus tracks and remixes on Metropolis Records in 2001 as Re:Initiation.

Track listing
"Memento Mori" – 6:00
"Waves (Take Me Alive)" – 4:41
"Cun Lacoudhir" – 6:24
"When I Was In My Prime" – 5:27
"Strategies of Movement" – 4:00
"Death by Moonlight" – 7:43
"Ocean" – 5:30
"Luft und Erde" – 0:41
"Hymn to Pan" – 7:12
"Tsunami" – 9:44

Re:Initiation track listing
This reissue of Initiation makes several changes to the album.  The running order has been changed; the track "When I Was In My Prime" has been dropped;  "Strategies of Movement" is heard in a longer mix; and the track "Ocean" is only heard in remixed form, as a bonus track.  Other bonus tracks include remixes of "Tsunami" and "Cun Lacoudhir", and three previously unreleased outtakes.

"Memento Mori" – 6:02
"Waves (Take Me Alive)" – 4:43
"Cun Lacoudhir (The Breaking Ice)" – 6:32
"Strategies of Movement" – 4:26
"Death by Moonlight" – 7:46
"Luft und Erde" – 0:45
"Hymn to Pan" – 7:07
"Tsunami" – 9:41
"Mantra" – 4:09
"Tsunami (Mudra Mix)" – 4:43
"Ocean" (Mudra Mix) – 4:47
"Anxia" – 4:41
"Breathe" – 0:51
"Cun Lacoudhir (Haujobb Mudra Mix)" – 7:32

Rhea's Obsession albums
1996 debut albums